Hami–Lop Nur railway or Haluo railway, is a railway in the eastern part of the Xinjiang Uyghur Autonomous Region of China between Hami and Lop Nur. Construction began in August 2010 and track laying was completed in late July 2012.

The line is mainly used to ship potassium salts mined near Lop Nur.

To ensure the supply of daily necessities for the staff along the line, commuter trains are officially launched from November 21, 2013, and commuter cars open every five days.

Rail connections
 Hami: Lanzhou–Xinjiang railway, Ejin–Hami railway

Stations
 (哈密南)
 (花园乡)
 (南湖)
 (沙哈)
 (巴特)
 (鲢鱼山)
 (黑龙峰)
 (多头山)
 (东台地)
 (罗中)

See also

 List of railways in China

References

Rail transport in Xinjiang
Railway lines opened in 2012